Nolan Island is an ice-covered island  long, lying  north of Court Ridge in Sulzberger Ice Shelf, along the coast of Marie Byrd Land. Discovered and mapped by the United States Antarctic Service (USAS), 1939–41. Named by Advisory Committee on Antarctic Names (US-ACAN) for William G. Nolan, RD1, U.S. Navy, Radarman aboard USS Glacier in Antarctica, 1957–58 and 1961–62.

See also 
 List of Antarctic and sub-Antarctic islands

Islands of Marie Byrd Land